Puerto Pérez or Ch'ililaya (Aymara) is the fourth municipal section of the Los Andes Province in the  La Paz Department, Bolivia. Its seat is Puerto Pérez.

References 

 Instituto Nacional de Estadística de Bolivia

Municipalities of La Paz Department (Bolivia)